Waka & Tammy: What The Flocka is an American reality television series that premiered on March 12, 2020, and airs on WE tv. It chronicles the lives of Waka Flocka Flame and Tammy Rivera as they navigate life after their time on Marriage Boot Camp: Hip Hop Edition. The backdoor pilot for the series, which featured their wedding, aired in March 2019.

On September 29, 2020, the series was renewed for a 8-episode second season.

Episodes

Series overview

Season 1 (2020)

Season 2 (2021)

Season 3 (2022)

Specials

References

External links 

2020 American television series debuts
2020s American reality television series
English-language television shows